Alex Bobocea (born October 14, 2002) is an American soccer player who plays as a goalkeeper for New York Red Bulls II in the USL Championship via the New York Red Bulls Academy.

Career

Youth
Bobocea played as a member of the New York Red Bulls academy from 2015. Whilst with the Red Bulls' academy, Bobocea was included on the team sheet for the club's USL Championship affiliate New York Red Bulls II during their 2019 and 2020 seasons. He made his debut as a 17th-minute substitute during a game against Loudoun United following starting goalkeeper Wallis Lapsley's sending off.

Participant in US national team camps in Carson CA and Sunrise Florida. Traveled with U15 National team to Croatia, played in Adidas ESP (Elite Soccer Program)tournament that took place from July 25–29th 2016 in San Jose for the MLS All Star Game. Participant with Red Bulls Academy to Next Generation tournament in Salzburg Austria in 2016 and 2017 (finished 4th).

College
Bobocea has committed to playing college soccer at Loyola University Maryland in the fall of 2020.

References

External links 
 
 ussoccerda.com profile
 U.S. U15 BNT Roster for Croatia Trip. topdrawersoccer.com.
 U.S. U15 BNT Roster Released for Sept. Camp. topdrawersoccer.com.
 Hackworth Calls in 36 Players for U15 YNT camp. topdrawersoccer.com.
 64-Player roster announced for U.S. Soccer Futures Camp at the U.S. Soccer National Training Center. ussoccerda.com.
 64-Player roster announced for U.S. Soccer Futures Camp at the U.S. Soccer National Training Center. topdrawersoccer.com.
 Academy Players to Watch for 2016/2017. topdrawersoccer.com.
 Adidas ESP rolls on with MLS All-Star Event. topdrawersoccer.com.

2002 births
Living people
American people of Romanian descent
American soccer players
Association football goalkeepers
Benjamin N. Cardozo High School alumni
New York Red Bulls II players
Sportspeople from Queens, New York
Soccer players from New York City
USL Championship players